A zvonnitsa is a large rectangular structure containing multiple arches or beams that support bells, and a basal platform where bell ringers stand to perform the ringing using long ropes. It was an alternative to a bell tower in Russian, Polish and Romanian medieval architectural traditions, primarily used in Russian architecture of the 14th-17th centuries. Currently, zvonnitsa are especially widespread in the environs of Pskov. 

Sometimes zvonnitsa were mounted directly on church roofs, resulting in a special form of church called a pod zvonom or izhe pod kolokoly. The most famous example of this type is the Church of St Ivan of the Ladder, adjacent to Ivan the Great Bell Tower in the Moscow Kremlin.

In Polish, the word Dzwonnica (:pl:Dzwonnica) refers to any type of bell tower, while the fortified trellis construction containing apertures for bells is referred to by the term dzwonnica parawanowa.

Examples

External links
 Zvonnitsa in the Great Soviet Encyclopedia
 Zvonnitsa in Architectural dictionary
 Zhuravlev Yu. V. Zvonnitsa of Sophia Cathedral
 A. G. Melnik. About zvonnitsa of Borisoglebsky Monastery
 Churches Under Bells

Bells (percussion)
Christian bell towers